Ronald Chase Amick (May 5, 1999 - January 26, 2021), better known by his stage name 6 Dogs, was an American rapper, artist, painter, and fashion designer from Dahlonega, Georgia. 
6 Dogs rose to prominence in 2017 via the music app Soundcloud after the success of multiple songs off his eponymous debut album, including “Faygo Dreams”, “Flossing”, and “Someone”, all of which have amassed multi millions of streams across numerous platforms, with “Faygo Dreams” having over 100 million streams on Spotify alone. He later released a collaborative mixtape with producer and friend Danny Wolf titled “6 Wolves” in 2018, featuring Yung Bans, and his second studio album titled “Hi Hats & Heartaches” in 2019. Throughout his career, he worked with numerous artists including Juice Wrld, Lil Skies, Cole Bennett, Benny Blanco, $not, Yung Gravy and more. Amick passed away on January 26, 2021. His posthumous and third studio album “RONALD” was released on March 12, 2021.

Early life 
6 Dogs, whose birth name was Ronald, was born on May 5, 1999, in the small city of Dahlonega, Georgia. He preferred to go by his middle name, which was Chase. Chase was brought up in a strict  Christian household, serving as an altar boy in his early years as a child, and regularly attending church masses. He got his first job as a  lifeguard when he was 16. After finding this to be incredibly mind numbing, he decided to pursue his long time goal of becoming a musician, more specifically a rapper. Because of his strict Christian household at the time, Chase had to make, record, and release his music in secret, typically going to a friends house to do so.

Career 
Chase released his first single “Demons in the A” on Soundcloud on August 9, 2016. He then released his self titled album "6 Dogs" to all streaming platforms on July 3, 2017. This album consisted of 13 songs that were previously only posted to his SoundCloud. His most popular song to date, "Faygo Dreams" was quite a hit in the SoundCloud rap scene. After his newfound success he signed to Interscope Records in 2018, and subsequently released "6 Wolves" with Danny Wolf in 2018. He released "Hi-Hats and Heartaches" in 2019, a mix of songs about his recent breakup, and flex music over dreamy trap production. Soon after this album released, he decided to leave his label and go independent releasing a series of singles from 2020 until his death in 2021. The next step in Chase's career was his nostalgic album "RONALD.", released on March 12, 2021, but fully completed and submitted before his death. This album is his most mature work, with Chase branching out and embracing many different sounds.

Death 
On January 26, 2021, it was reported that 6 Dogs had passed away due to falling from a building.

Discography 
Studio albums
 6 Dogs (2017)
 6 Wolves (2018)
 Hi-Hats & Heartaches (2019) 
 RONALD (2021)

References 

1999 births
2021 deaths
21st-century American rappers
American male rappers
Emo rap musicians
People from Dahlonega, Georgia
Suicides in the United States

